The Soling North American Championship is an International sailing regatta in the Soling organized by the International Soling Association under auspiciën of World Sailing. The initiative for this event was taken, inspired by the success of the Soling European Championship, by Milwaukee Yacht Club sailor Jack Van Dyke in 1969 to promote Soling sailing in the US and Canada. Since then over 50 Soling North American Championship were held. The popularity grew during the Olympic period of the Soling. After that era the event continued and is still reasonable successful. The Soling North American Championship is an "Open" event. This means that competitors from all over the world are eligible to enter. So far oversees entries have only won the Championship three times:
 Australia in 1975 (Australia)
 Brasil in 1981 (South America)
 The Netherlands in 2019 (Europe)
In all other cases the title went to a team of the United States or Canada (first time in 1973).

Editions

Medalists

Race details
 Soling North American Championship results (1969–1979)
 Soling North American Championship results (1980–1989)
 Soling North American Championship results (1990–1999)
 Soling North American Championship results (2000–2009)
 Soling North American Championship results (2010–2019)

References

 
North America and Caribbean championships in sailing
Recurring sporting events established in 1969
1969 establishments in Wisconsin